Ben Youssef Meïté (November 11, 1986) is a sprinter from Côte d'Ivoire. In 2010 he competed at the 2010 African Championships in Nairobi and won the gold medal with a time of 10.08 seconds. He went on to compete in the 2016 Summer Olympics in Rio de Janeiro, Brazil where he finished fifth in the 100 meter dash with a personal best and national record of 9.96.

Competition record

References

External links 

 

1986 births
Living people
People from Woroba District
Ivorian male sprinters
Olympic athletes of Ivory Coast
Athletes (track and field) at the 2012 Summer Olympics
Athletes (track and field) at the 2016 Summer Olympics
Athletes (track and field) at the 2015 African Games
World Athletics Championships athletes for Ivory Coast
African Games gold medalists for Ivory Coast
African Games medalists in athletics (track and field)
African Games silver medalists for Ivory Coast
Islamic Solidarity Games medalists in athletics